Forestville Baptist Church is a historic Baptist church located at Wake Forest in Wake County, North Carolina, a satellite town of the state capital Raleigh. Constructed in 1860, the church building is a combination of Greek Revival and Italianate  style architecture.  The building may be attributed to Jacob W. Holt, or his brother, Thomas J. Holt, architect with the Raleigh
and Gaston Railroad.

In October 1984, Forestville Baptist Church was listed on the National Register of Historic Places.

See also
 List of Registered Historic Places in North Carolina

References

External links
Forestville Baptist Church Cemetery interments

Churches completed in 1860
19th-century Baptist churches in the United States
Baptist churches in North Carolina
Churches in Wake County, North Carolina
Greek Revival church buildings in North Carolina
Italianate architecture in North Carolina
National Register of Historic Places in Wake County, North Carolina
Churches on the National Register of Historic Places in North Carolina
Italianate church buildings in the United States